Rafał Maciej Kurzawa (born 29 January 1993) is a Polish professional footballer who plays as a left winger for Ekstraklasa side Pogoń Szczecin.

Club career
On 31 January 2019, Kurzawa was loaned out to Danish Superliga club FC Midtjylland for six months. Kurzawa returned to Amiens SC in the summer 2019 but didn't take part in any games for the club, before he was loaned out to Denmark again, this time to Esbjerg fB on 26 January 2020 for the rest of the season. Returning to Amiens in the summer 2020, his contract was terminated by mutual agreement on 6 October 2020.

International career
In June 2018, Kurzawa was named in the Poland national team's final 23-man squad for the 2018 FIFA World Cup in Russia.

He had one appearance for the Poland in 2017 and five appearances in 2018.

References

External links

1993 births
Living people
People from Wieruszów
Polish footballers
Poland international footballers
Association football midfielders
Ekstraklasa players
I liga players
II liga players
III liga players
Ligue 1 players
Danish Superliga players
Górnik Zabrze players
Amiens SC players
FC Midtjylland players
Esbjerg fB players
Pogoń Szczecin players
2018 FIFA World Cup players
Polish expatriate footballers
Expatriate men's footballers in Denmark
Expatriate footballers in France
Polish expatriate sportspeople in Denmark
Polish expatriate sportspeople in France
KS ROW 1964 Rybnik players